Alfred Hettner (August 6, 1859 in Dresden – August 31, 1941 in Heidelberg) was a German geographer.

He is known for his concept of chorology, the study of places and regions, a concept that influenced both Carl O. Sauer and Richard Hartshorne. Apart from Europe, his fieldwork concentrated mainly on Colombia, Chile and Russia.

Alfred Hettner, who obtained his PhD from the University of Strasbourg, was also a pupil of Ferdinand von Richthofen and Friedrich Ratzel in Leipzig—where he obtained his habilitation. His book Europe was published in 1907. According to him, geography is a chorological science or it is a study of regions. Hettner rejected the view that geography could be either general or regional. Geography, like other fields of learning, must deal in both unique things (regional geography) and with the universal (general geography), but the study of regions — especially in the form of his  approach — is the main field of geography.

Literary works 
 Methodische Zeit- und Streitfragen, in: Geographische Zeitschrift, Bd. 29 (1923), S. 49-50
 Die Geographie, ihre Geschichte, ihr Wesen und ihre Methoden, Breslau, 1927

External links
 Die Heidelberger Hettner-Lecture 
 
 Short biography of Alfred Hettner (in German)

German geographers
1859 births
1941 deaths
Recipients of the Cullum Geographical Medal
German geomorphologists